Ines Ajanović (Serbian Cyrillic: Инес Ајановић; born November 12, 1980) is a Serbian professional basketball player.

Professional career
Ines plays for CAB Madeira in the Portugal Basketball League. She is a former member of the Serbian national basketball team.

External links
Profile at eurobasket.com
Biography at prodep.com

1980 births
Living people
Serbian women's basketball players
Basketball players from Belgrade
ŽKK Radivoj Korać players
ŽKK Crvena zvezda players
Power forwards (basketball)
Centers (basketball)
Serbian expatriate basketball people in Hungary
Serbian expatriate basketball people in Italy
Serbian expatriate basketball people in France
Serbian expatriate basketball people in Spain
Serbian expatriate basketball people in Latvia
Serbian expatriate basketball people in Poland
Serbian expatriate basketball people in Portugal
Serbian expatriate basketball people in Romania
Serbian expatriate basketball people in Brazil